Hamilton S. Peck (October 22, 1845 – October 12, 1933) was an American attorney and politician from Burlington, Vermont.  A Republican, among the offices in which he served were alderman (1883-1885), city court judge (1888-1894), and mayor (1896-1898).

Early life
Hamilton Sullivan Peck was born in Royalston, Massachusetts on Oct. 22, 1845, a son of Sullivan and Czarina (Davis) Peck.  He was educated in Royalston, and attended high school in Athol, Massachusetts.  He moved to Burlington, Vermont with his family in 1865, and completed his high school education after becoming a resident of Vermont.

In 1866, Peck began attendance at the University of Vermont, from which he graduated with a Bachelor of Arts degree in 1870.  While in college, Peck was a member of the Sigma Phi fraternity and was elected to Phi Beta Kappa.

Career
Peck taught school in Burlington for three years while studying law at the firm of Torrey E. Wales and Russell S. Taft, and attained admission to the bar in 1873.  He established a practice in Burlington became active in politics as a Republican.

From 1878 to 1880, Peck served as State's Attorney of Chittenden County.  He served as an alderman from 1883 to 1885, and was judge of Burlington’s city court from 1888 to 1894.  From 1892 to 1896, Peck was secretary of the Vermont Republican State Committee, and he was president of the state Republican League from 1896 to 1898. From 1896 to 1898 he served as mayor of Burlington. In 1900, he was appointed judge advocate general of the Vermont National Guard with the rank of brigadier general and her served until 1904.  Peck represented Burlington in the Vermont House of Representatives from 1910 to 1912.

Peck served as Burlington’s city attorney from 1918 to 1918 and 1923 to 1925.  From 1917 to 1919 he represented Chittenden County in the Vermont Senate.  He served in the Vermont House of Representatives again from 1927 to 1931   From 1929 to 1932, Peck again served as judge of Burlington’s city court.

After settling in Burlington, Peck was long active in civic and philanthropic organizations.  In addition to attaining the 33rd Degree of Freemasonry, he was a member of the Shriners. He was also a member of the Independent Order of Odd Fellows, Knights of Pythias, Modern Woodmen of America, Benevolent and Protective Order of Elks, and Ethan Allen Club.

Death and burial
Peck died in Burlington on October 12, 1933.  He received Masonic honors at his funeral, which was held in Burlington’s Congregational church.  Peck was buried at Lakeview Cemetery in Burlington.

Family
On January 28, 1875, Peck married Selina Atwood Aiken of Hardwick, Vermont.  They were the parents of a son, Dr. Roy Hamilton Peck of Springfield, Massachusetts.

References

Sources

Books

Newspapers

External links

1845 births
1933 deaths
People from Royalston, Massachusetts
Politicians from Burlington, Vermont
University of Vermont alumni
Vermont lawyers
19th-century American politicians
Mayors of Burlington, Vermont
Republican Party members of the Vermont House of Representatives
Republican Party Vermont state senators
Vermont state court judges
National Guard (United States) generals
Burials at Lakeview Cemetery (Burlington, Vermont)
Military personnel from Massachusetts